As a live sketch comedy show, NBC's Saturday Night Live (officially abbreviated to SNL) has had a number of technical problems, performer mishaps, and controversial content. Several hosts and musical guests have received negative press due to their appearances on the program, including musician Sinéad O'Connor, comedian Andrew Dice Clay, then-Presidential candidate Donald Trump, and the bands Rage Against the Machine and Fear. In the course of the show's forty-plus-year history, several technical issues have occurred live on air, most notably with singer Ashlee Simpson. Other times, controversial content has been edited out of syndicated reruns and online-distributed editions of the show, including coarse language. The show has "banned" certain hosts and has also been accused of plagiarism.

Technical issues

Ashlee Simpson

Singer and actress Ashlee Simpson appeared as a musical guest on the October 23, 2004 episode with Jude Law as host. Her first performance, "Pieces of Me", was performed without incident, but when she began her second song, "Autobiography", the vocals for "Pieces of Me" were heard again — before she had even raised the microphone to her mouth. Simpson began to do an impromptu jig, and then left the stage. During the closing of the show, Simpson appeared with Law and said: "I feel so bad. My band started playing the wrong song. I didn't know what to do so I thought I'd do a hoedown."

On October 25, Simpson explained that due to complications arising from severe acid reflux disease, she had completely lost her voice and her doctor had advised her not to sing. Her father wanted her to use a vocal guide track for the performance after she had suffered vocal issues during rehearsals. Simpson stated of the incident, "I made a complete fool of myself." According to Simpson, the drummer hit the wrong button, which caused the wrong track to be played. Lorne Michaels had been unaware of the plan to use lip synching, and said in an interview with 60 Minutes that he would not have allowed it if he had been consulted. Simpson is the only musical guest ever to walk off stage during a live performance at SNL. Simpson returned to the show on October 8, 2005, and performed without incident.

Controversies

Fear
In 1981, director Penelope Spheeris made a film titled The Decline of Western Civilization; the film featured an appearance by the punk rock group Fear. This appearance in particular caught the attention of former cast member John Belushi, who lobbied successfully to get the band a spot as a musical guest on the 1981 Halloween episode of SNL. Belushi had originally offered Fear the soundtrack for his major motion picture Neighbors. The film's producers eventually forced Fear off the project, and Belushi got them the infamous SNL gig as compensation. The band's appearance included a group of slamdancers, among them Belushi, Ian MacKaye of Minor Threat (and later Fugazi), Tesco Vee of The Meatmen, Harley Flanagan and John Joseph of the Cro-Mags, and John Brannon of Negative Approach. The show's director originally wanted to prevent the dancers from participating, so Belushi offered to be in the episode if the dancers were allowed to stay. The result was the shortening of Fear's appearance on TV. Frontman Lee Ving started the band's second song by stating, "It's great to be in New Jersey", drawing boos from SNLs New York live audience. Fear played "I Don't Care About You", "Beef Bologna", "New York's Alright If You Like Saxophones", and started to play "Let's Have a War" when the telecast faded into commercial. The slamdancers left ripe pumpkin remains on the set. Cameras, a piano, and other property were damaged in a situation that was close to a stage riot.

After their SNL appearance, which resulted in $20,000 in damage, some clubs chose not to hire the band. A New York Post article later reported the figure to be $500,000. This is believed to have originated from Ving, who told the Post that "...we caused $500,000 worth of damage, a cool half a million dollars worth of damage, ‘cause we’re professionals, and I counted the damage myself." Since this incident, Fear has not appeared on Saturday Night Live again.

Andrew Dice Clay
When Andrew Dice Clay was scheduled as a host for the May 12, 1990 episode, cast member Nora Dunn immediately announced to the press that she was boycotting the show in protest. She stated the protest was in view of Clay's perceivably misogynistic act, and did so without informing Michaels, the cast, or most of the crew about her intent. The public backlash was immediate; the selection of Clay was compared to the Holocaust by an audience member during an interview with Michaels. Female members of the cast and crew were harassed by phone and mail for sticking with the show, and metal detectors were installed at the studio to enhance security. NBC censors insisted that the episode be aired with a delay to compensate for anything Clay might say on air. During the live show, some audience members heckled Clay but were immediately removed by the increased security detail. Dunn's contract was already coming to an end, and with one episode left in the season, the staff voted against having her take part in the final episode of the season, and her contract was not renewed. Dunn later expressed her surprise at the lack of support she received from her colleagues in her refusal to participate.

Sinéad O'Connor was scheduled to be the musical guest for the episode, but she also boycotted the show because of Clay's involvement, forcing the producers to find two musical replacements, with one performance by Julee Cruise and a second by Spanic Boys.

Sinéad O'Connor

On October 3, 1992, O'Connor was scheduled to appear, performing an a cappella performance of Bob Marley's "War". During the dress rehearsal of the episode, O'Connor held up a photo of a Balkan child as a protest of child abuse in war before bowing and leaving the stage, which the episode's director Dave Wilson described as a "very tender moment". During the live show, O'Connor changed the "War" lyric "fight racial injustice" to "fight child abuse" as a protest against the then still relatively unknown cases of sexual abuse in the Roman Catholic Church. She presented a photo of Pope John Paul II while singing the word "evil", before tearing the image into pieces and saying "Fight the real enemy!"

NBC had no foreknowledge of O'Connor's plan, and Wilson purposely failed to use the "applause" button, leaving the audience to sit in silence. Tim Robbins, who was the host for that episode and was raised as a devout Catholic, refused to acknowledge O'Connor at the end of the show. NBC received thousands of irate calls in the aftermath of the incident, and protests against O'Connor occurred outside of 30 Rockefeller Plaza, where a steamroller crushed dozens of her tapes, CDs, and LPs. In the following weeks on SNL, Catholic guests Joe Pesci and Madonna both voiced their opposition to O'Connor. The show also aired several sketches mocking O'Connor. She has not appeared on Saturday Night Live since. The incident occurred a full nine years before John Paul II, in a 2001 apology, acknowledged that the sexual abuse within the Church was "a profound contradiction of the teaching and witness of Jesus Christ", followed in 2008 by Pope Benedict XVI apologizing and meeting with victims, speaking of his "shame" at the evil of abuse, calling for perpetrators to be brought to justice, and denouncing mishandling by church authorities.

NBC still declines to rebroadcast the sequence with the exception of an interview with O'Connor on MSNBC's The Rachel Maddow Show, which aired on April 24, 2010, when the clip was aired in full. In reruns, the incident is replaced with the dress rehearsal performance. The original episode was made available on volume four of the DVD special "Saturday Night Live – 25 Years of Music", with an introduction by Michaels about the incident. On February 20, 2011, the clip was aired on the SNL special "Backstage" showing footage of the dress rehearsal and live performance side by side. The footage cuts to interviewees during the moment the photo was ripped.

The incident was mocked during an episode of the television show 30 Rock (created by former Saturday Night Live head writer Tina Fey) in which it is mentioned that Tracy Jordan, star of TGS (the show's in-universe analogue to Saturday Night Live) tore up a picture of the pope during an episode; it is replied, "In his defense, it was Pope Innocent IV, because he increased taxation in the Papal States." A later episode parodied the Saturday Night Live incident when an NBC page (Kristen Schaal) goes on stage and tears a picture of O'Connor in half. It was also mocked in the third episode of The Life of Rock with Brian Pern, which features the fictional title musician Brian Pern's appearance on a 1992 episode of Saturday Night Live, where he tears up a picture of The Fonz, calling him "evil" after remarking "lies", as a protest against Happy Days providing a distraction to the American public from American foreign policy aggression.

This incident was also spoofed by the Australian band TISM on the album cover of Censored Due to Legal Advice. The album really was censored due to a lawsuit. The original name of the album was Australia the Lucky Cunt and depicted a koala drawn in the style of artist Ken Done with a syringe in its mouth. Done was angered by this cover and on the week after the album's September 1993 release date obtained an injunction order banning the sale of the album. The album was re-released in November the same year under the Censored Due to Legal Advice title with the cover depicting four images of O'Connor on Saturday Night Live edited to show her tearing up a sheet of the TISM logo and the album title on it instead of the pope.

Rage Against the Machine

On April 13, 1996, musical guests Rage Against the Machine (RATM) were scheduled to perform two songs. The show was hosted that night by billionaire and then-presidential candidate Steve Forbes. According to RATM guitarist Tom Morello, "RATM wanted to stand in sharp juxtaposition to a billionaire telling jokes and promoting his flat tax by making our own statement." To this end, the band hung two upside-down American flags from their amplifiers. Seconds before they took the stage to perform "Bulls on Parade", stagehands were sent in to pull the flags down. Following the removal of the flags during the first performance, the band was approached by NBC officials and ordered to immediately leave the building.  Upon hearing this, bassist Tim Commerford reportedly stormed Forbes' dressing room, throwing shreds from one of the torn-down flags. Morello said that members of the SNL cast and crew, whom he declined to name, "expressed solidarity with our actions, and a sense of shame that their show had censored the performance." Since this incident, Rage Against the Machine has not appeared on Saturday Night Live again.

Donald Trump

Donald Trump's second hosting appearance, in the midst of his 2016 presidential campaign, courted controversy and protests. Latino advocacy groups pressed NBC to cancel Trump's appearance, due to his remarks on Mexican immigration, while protestors picketed Trump Tower and 30 Rockefeller Plaza in the days preceding and of the show, holding "DUMP TRUMP" signs. That group created a petition to cancel Trump's hosting with over 500,000 signatures, delivering it to Michaels and NBCUniversal Chief Executive Steve Burke. The Congressional Hispanic Caucus issued a "statement of opposition" to Trump's appearance. The group DeportRacism.com offered $5,000 in cash to any audience member that would heckle Trump and call him a racist during his monologue.

The show aired on November 7, 2015, and due to the equal-time rule, Trump only appeared for a total of twelve minutes. The notion of heckling was referenced in the show, when Larry David (who had guested earlier in the evening to play politician Bernie Sanders) called Trump a racist, but only to secure the $5,000. In the end, the episode received 9.3 million viewers—the program's highest ratings in nearly four years—but was panned by critics. NBC subsequently offered free airtime to Republican candidates who filed equal time requests.

Kanye West
On September 29, 2018, during the end credits, musical guest Kanye West, who wore a "Make America Great Again" hat, launched into a third performance with the song "Ghost Town" featuring Kid Cudi and 070 Shake. Midway through the performance, NBC cut to commercial, as the show had reached the end of its allotted airtime. After finishing the performance, West began pontificating about the "liberal media" attacking President Donald Trump and his own 2020 presidential bid. This resulted in boos from the audience, as the cast stood off to the side of the stage and kept their heads down. The impromptu speech was captured in part by comedian and former SNL cast member Chris Rock. During the rant that was uploaded to Twitter by West's record producer, Mike Dean, West accused the cast and crew of bullying him about supporting Trump.

Elon Musk
Tesla Motors and SpaceX CEO Elon Musk hosted the May 8, 2021 episode of Saturday Night Live with musical guest Miley Cyrus. The announcement received major criticism and backlash due to Musk's reputedly unlikeable personality and problematic history, with some questioning why Musk was chosen in the first place instead of having Cyrus pull double duty for the third time. Some cast members—Aidy Bryant, Michael Che, Andrew Dismukes, and Bowen Yang—have voiced their opinions about the choice of Musk via Instagram stories. Che and Dismukes joked about the controversy; while Che responded to an angry tweet made by actor John Cusack by confusing him with his sister Joan Cusack, but elsewhere stated "To me, it makes it exciting, I mean, everybody wants to watch now, so that's cool". Bryant and Yang, however, were straightforward with their opinions, with Bryant posting a tweet made by Bernie Sanders about wealthy people such as Musk earning more than the American people during the pandemic, and Yang posted a shocked emoji and a response to a cryptic tweet made by Musk about his hosting gig with Yang saying "what the fuck does this even mean?" Some critics on Twitter claimed this booking was similar to the Donald Trump/Sia episode and blamed Lorne Michaels for making this decision.

Woody Harrelson
In his opening monologue on February 25, 2023, Woody Harrelson likened the COVID-19 pandemic to a drug cartel, saying; 

Harrelson was roundly criticized for his remarks by a number of individuals who saw the monologue, including Matt Wilstein of The Daily Beast who remarked, in relation to the topic, that it "turns out there may have been a reason the rest of the Five-Timers weren’t there to welcome him into their club." However, the monologue was praised by Twitter CEO and owner (and fellow Saturday Night Live host) Elon Musk, who quote tweeted an upload of it with a statement reading “So based. Nice work.”

Other
A number of hosts and musical guests have been "banned" from appearing on the show again and there have been examples of other controversial goings-on within SNL. Examples of these are noted below.

Incidents
 On December 13, 1975, the show was ordered by NBC network officials to run the episode hosted by comedian Richard Pryor on a five-second tape delay. Engineers at the show later said they did not run the delay because no one knew how to achieve the effect. However, the first edition of The Book of Lists, describing the broadcast, indicated that two words were deleted during the broadcast, although what was censored is not specified.
 The December 15, 1979, episode featured three songs by musical guest David Bowie, concluding with a performance of "Boys Keep Swinging", which used a green screen effect to superimpose Bowie's head on the body of a marionette he operated while singing. Censors muted the lyric "other boys check you out" during the performance, but were unable to react in time when the song concluded with a large phallus repeatedly popping out of the marionette's pants. The episode was not edited further for rebroadcasts.
 The episode of February 21, 1981, hosted by Dallas star Charlene Tilton, featured a parody of the famed "Who shot J.R.?" story arc from the then-popular nighttime soap. During the show a plot line had cast member Charles Rocket and Tilton flirting while other cast members expressed jealousy, leading to Rocket being shot in the chest by a sniper in the middle of a sketch. In the show's closing moments, as cast members gathered with the host to say good night, Tilton asked Rocket how he felt about being shot. In character, Rocket replied "Oh man, it's the first time I've ever been shot in my life. I'd like to know who the fuck did it." He attempted to explain it away as an extemporaneous exclamation. This later contributed to Rocket's dismissal from the show. During this same episode, musical guest Prince was thought to have sung the lyric "Fightin' war is such a fuckin' bore" during his performance of "Partyup", but it went largely unnoticed at the time, as censors either missed it or were unsure whether he actually had said "fuckin'" or "funkin'".
 A stand-up routine by Sam Kinison during the October 18, 1986, episode was edited for the West Coast telecast and later airings, replacing two sections of the routine with a silent image of the previous season's cast. The first cutaway occurred when Kinison encouraged the legalization of cannabis and said: "You can't get any more pot. If you give us back the pot, we'll forget about the crack." The joke violated NBC policy of the time that all references to drugs must be negative. The second, longer cutaway occurred when Kinison made a joke about the Crucifixion. During rehearsal, Kinison had not performed the drug joke but he had performed, and been asked to remove, the Crucifixion joke.
 In a December 5, 1992, "Wayne's World" sketch, the characters Wayne and Garth (portrayed by Mike Myers and Dana Carvey) made fun of Chelsea Clinton, daughter of then-President-elect Bill Clinton. Wayne noted that while "adolescence has been thus far unkind" to the then-twelve-year-old Chelsea, Garth opined that "she could turn into a babe in waiting." First Lady Hillary Clinton was publicly critical of the jokes, and they were subsequently edited out of all repeats and syndication rebroadcasts of this sketch. "We felt, upon reflection, that if it was in any way hurtful, it wasn't worth it," said executive producer Lorne Michaels. "She's a kid, a kid who didn't choose to be in public life." Myers himself wrote a letter of apology to the White House.
 The 13th episode of SNL 19th season, aired the weekend before Valentine's Day in 1994, featured a sketch in which host Alec Baldwin portrays a scoutmaster making overt sexual advances towards the Boy Scout character Canteen Boy (played by Adam Sandler). The sketch generated a considerable amount of complaints from viewers, who felt it was homophobic and trivialized pedophilia. Chicago Sun-Times columnist Richard Roeper stated that he received calls from his readers claiming they stopped watching the sketch before it finished, while the Boy Scouts of America said: "We see nothing funny about child molestation, and are surprised that this unfunny subject would be selected for a comedy sketch." Baldwin said that NBC received 300,000 phone call complaints and lost seven affiliates due to the sketch, though this was proven false. Nonetheless, the sketch frequently appears in lists of the most controversial SNL moments, and reruns add a disclaimer that Sandler's character is 27 years old.
 During an April 12, 1997, Weekend Update story about Tabitha Soren, anchor Norm Macdonald, a cast member who was no stranger to on-air controversies during his tenure at the Weekend Update desk, appeared to cough and choke momentarily, causing him to pause and then mutter live, "What the fuck was that?" The audience applauded, and Macdonald laughed the error away, saying at one point that he hoped everyone was enjoying "my farewell performance" and, in closing, "Maybe we'll see you next week". He was fired at the start of January 1998, partly because of this incident and partly (according to NBC's management, and disputed by much of the cast) due to a "drop in ratings and general reduction of quality." Macdonald and others believed that the real reason for his dismissal was the inclusion of a series of jokes calling O. J. Simpson a murderer during and after his double murder trial in Los Angeles. NBC Entertainment president Don Ohlmeyer was good friends with Simpson, and had thrown a party for the jurors who acquitted Simpson after the trial. The jokes were written primarily by Macdonald and longtime SNL writer Jim Downey, who was fired from SNL outright at the same time. Downey was re-hired in 2000. Macdonald was replaced on Weekend Update by Colin Quinn, beginning on the January 10, 1998 episode. Macdonald's firing was widely criticized, most notably by comedian Chevy Chase, who was largely responsible for originating Weekend Update. Chase argued that Macdonald's "time in the chair [was] among the funniest and [most] well-written of all the Weekend Update stints".

 In March 1998, a Robert Smigel animated short film called Conspiracy Theory Rock, a parody of the show Schoolhouse Rock!, aired as part of the TV Funhouse segment. The scathingly political short accused big corporations, including Time Warner, Disney, Fox, Westinghouse, and then-owner of NBC General Electric, of developing a media monopoly to manipulate public perception and conceal questionable actions. The clip aired only once as part of the original SNL episode and was removed from syndicated repeats, with Michaels explaining that it "wasn't funny" (thereby ironically seeming to confirm the semi-satirical accusation). The clip was eventually released as part of the Saturday TV Funhouse compilation DVD in 2006.
 While performing their single "B.Y.O.B." on May 7, 2005, System of a Down's Daron Malakian exclaimed "fuck yeah". The band had previously refused to self-censor their performance, leading censors to mute "fuck" each time it was sung, but miss Malakian's impromptu yell. It was subsequently edited out of the West Coast telecast of the show.
 The episode hosted by Rainn Wilson, aired on February 24, 2007, and featured a sketch entitled "Danny's Song," wherein bar patrons listen to the titular song and reminisce about inappropriate memories. A character played by Bill Hader says, "He loved this song. I remember we had this one great day at the park. We just had so much fun. He was running in the grass and chasing squirrels. They had this fountain and we threw pennies in it for hours. So great. It was the first day that I ever thought to myself: 'I have a dad. And not that I have a dad with Down's syndrome. He loved crayons.'" The skit prompted criticism from Jon Colman, the CEO of the National Down Syndrome Society, which led to the words "Down's syndrome" being bleeped in later rebroadcasts.
 On September 26, 2009, Jenny Slate made her SNL debut in a "biker babes" sketch alongside Kristen Wiig and actress Megan Fox in which their characters repeatedly use the word "frickin'". In one instance Slate accidentally said "fuckin'" instead, which was dubbed over with "freakin'" for subsequent airings. Slate was "pulled back" in subsequent episodes.
 On December 15, 2012, actor Samuel L. Jackson, appearing on the recurring Kenan Thompson sketch "What Up with That?" as a talk show guest whose segment was cut for time, exclaimed what sounded like the words "fuck" and "bullshit". Thompson ad-libbed in response, "C'mon, Sam, that costs money!" Jackson later claimed he had not said the full word "fuck" and that Thompson was supposed to cut off his second expletive.
 On March 12, 2016, Ariana Grande uttered the word "shit" during her opening monologue. The profanity was "expected" to be edited out of the West Coast broadcast, but was not.
 On November 12, 2016, host Dave Chappelle deliberately used the words "goddamn" and "nigger" throughout his monologue and in several sketches. Although NBC did not censor Chappelle, Raleigh affiliate WRAL-TV, which had only joined the network earlier in the year, did so, as it found airing profanity to be in violation of its own policy.
 On February 4, 2017, host Kristen Stewart said that hosting the show was "the coolest fucking thing ever" during her opening monologue. Stewart realized her mistake, apologized and joked that she would never be invited back. She hosted again on November 2, 2019.
 The episode hosted by Gal Gadot aired on October 7, 2017, and featured a sketch entitled "Safelite AutoGlass." The sketch drew controversy for a scene in which a Safelite windshield repairman purposely breaks a customer's windshield in order to hit on the customer's 17-year-old daughter. The sketch was subsequently pulled from rebroadcasts and the Internet. Rebroadcasts replaced the sketch with a previously unaired sketch entitled "The Last Fry".
 On January 13, 2018, host Sam Rockwell accidentally said "you can't be this fucking stupid" while in character as a frustrated children's television host reminiscent of Mr. Wizard. In the same episode, Weekend Update co-anchor Colin Jost said the word "shithole" in reference to then-President Donald Trump's comments about "shithole countries" despite NBC asking him to say "s-hole." Both incidents were censored for the West Coast broadcast of the show.
 On November 3, 2018, cast member Pete Davidson said during his Weekend Update First Impressions segment on the 2018 Midterm Election candidates that Lieutenant Commander Dan Crenshaw looked like "a hitman in a porno movie." Crenshaw himself made a cameo on the next episode's Weekend Update, in which Davidson apologised to him. Davidson later rescinded the apology, implying that he apologised because he was compelled to do so.
 On September 12, 2019, the night before SNL planned to announce the three new cast members hired for the 45th season, several offensive remarks made by incoming cast member Shane Gillis were made public. Freelance comedy reporter Seth Simons posted clips, since removed from YouTube, of an episode of Matt and Shane's Secret Podcast from 2018 in which Gillis made racist and mocking remarks about Chinese people. A video of the podcast, removed before Gillis's hiring but reposted to Twitter, showed Gillis using racial slurs against Asian people, making derogatory references to the food they eat, and discussing his frustration with their inability to learn English, later referring to it as "good racism". Early in 2019, he called Democratic presidential nominee Andrew Yang a "Jew Chink". Gillis responded to the backlash with what Vox and The Huffington Post characterized as a non-apology. Four days later, on September 16, a spokesperson for Michaels announced that Gillis had been removed from the cast.
 On the November 7, 2020, episode, Dave Chappelle said "nigga" several times during the opening monologue. It was unclear whether or not this would result in a response from the FCC.
 On the February 20, 2021, episode, Weekend Update co-host Michael Che said, "Israel is reporting that they've vaccinated half of their population, and I'm gonna guess it's the Jewish half". This joke was criticized by Israeli officials and by several major U.S. Jewish groups, including the American Jewish Committee, who accused Che's joke of being an antisemitic trope.
 On May 8, 2021, a sketch titled "Gen Z Hospital" that played on popular Internet phrases, derived from African-American Vernacular English was met with criticism by Twitter users calling the show out for poking fun at it. Sketch writer Michael Che responded on Instagram on May 10 writing: "I've been reading about how my 'gen z' sketch was misappropriating AAVE and I was stunned cause what the fuck is 'AAVE'? I had to look it up. Turns out it's an acronym for 'African American vernacular english.' You know, AAVE! That ol' saying that actual black people use in conversation all the time...look, the sketch bombed. I'm used to that. I meant no offense to the 'aave' community. I love aave. Aave to the moon!"
 On May 22, 2021, rapper Lil Nas X had a wardrobe malfunction during a musical performance as he ripped his pants.
 The October 8, 2022 episode hosted by Brendan Gleeson featured a sketch that parodied a recent cheating controversy from the American online comedy group The Try Guys. The sketch was met with criticism for downplaying the severity of the situation, with many noting that behind closed doors, The Try Guys were ultimately handling workplace misconduct, and that the sketch writers undermined how a situation like this should be handled.

Banned performers
The following performers have been banned from either hosting or performing on Saturday Night Live mostly due to being badly rehearsed, going offscript (which Lorne Michaels reportedly hates), camera-mugging, not getting along with the cast and crew, or anything else that would be inappropriate.

On the October 29, 1977 episode, host Charles Grodin performed the entire episode as if he was incompetent, the cast never letting on that it was all on purpose. This led to the rumor he was banned. Any mention of a ban has since been debunked as part of the joke. Lorne Michaels invited him to host again but Grodin declined.
 On the December 17, 1977 episode hosted by Miskel Spillman (winner of the "Anyone Can Host" contest), Elvis Costello was the musical guest. Costello was slated to perform "Less Than Zero" due to pressure from his record company. Costello disagreed, and felt that the song, which was about British Union of Fascists leader Oswald Mosley, would not be understood by an American audience and was too low-key to make much impact. After only a few bars, Costello stopped his band, and said to the audience, "I'm sorry, ladies and gentlemen, but there's no reason to do this song here." The band then began to play "Radio Radio" instead. Costello was not invited back until 1989 and 1991. He parodied the incident on the 25th anniversary show by interrupting the Beastie Boys' performance of "Sabotage", which quickly morphed into a joint performance of "Radio Radio" with the Beastie Boys as his backing ensemble.
 Frank Zappa was banned after his 1978 episode for doing a "disastrous job of hosting the show", mugging for the camera, and even announcing to the audience that he was reading from cue cards.
 On April 14, 1979, Milton Berle guest-hosted the program. Berle's long reputation for taking control of an entire television production—whether invited to do so or not—was a cause of major on-set stress. One of the show's writers, Rosie Shuster, described the rehearsals for the Berle SNL show, and the telecast, as "watching a comedy train accident in slow motion on a loop." Upstaging, camera mugging, doing spit-takes, inserting old comedy bits, and climaxing the show with a maudlin performance of "September Song" complete with a pre-arranged standing ovation (something producer Lorne Michaels had never sanctioned) resulted in Berle being banned from hosting the show again. The episode was also barred from being rerun until surfacing in 2003, because Michaels thought it brought down the show's reputation.
 In 1982, Robert Blake was banned after taking a script, crumpling it up, and throwing it into the face of cast member and writer Gary Kroeger.
 In 1986, The Replacements were banned after they came out drunk during their performance of "Bastards of Young" and later appeared in each other's clothes during the second performance. However, Paul Westerberg later went solo and was allowed to appear. The band did not perform again on any NBC television program until 2014, when they appeared on The Tonight Show Starring Jimmy Fallon.
 Steven Seagal was banned after hosting in 1991. Lorne Michaels called him the "worst host ever" as well as difficult to work with. In a later episode hosted by Nicolas Cage, Lorne Michaels got in a jab at Seagal. When Cage lamented during his monologue that the audience might think he's the biggest jerk who's ever been on the show, Michaels responded "No, no. That would be Steven Seagal."
 A portion of Martin Lawrence's February 19, 1994 monologue concerning feminine hygiene was removed from all repeats and replaced with a voice-over and intertitles stating that the excised portion "...was a frank and lively presentation, and nearly cost us all our jobs." Lawrence also made references to genitalia when he talked about the John and Lorena Bobbitt incident. This led to Lawrence being subsequently banned from ever hosting, appearing, or even being mentioned on the show, although Leslie Jones mentioned his show Martin during a 2016 Weekend Update segment.
 Original Weekend Update anchor Chevy Chase's issues with cast members and writers led to his being the only SNL alum banned from the show. While he had fought Bill Murray during his time as a cast member, and insulted Robert Downey Jr. and Terry Sweeney when returning as a guest host in 1985, the ban came in 1997 after he harassed women on the show, including Cheri Oteri, whom he hit on the back of the head. The ban only appears to be limited to hosting, however, as Chase participated in sketches and specials since 1997.
 In 2003, Adrien Brody introduced musical guest Sean Paul while wearing fake dreadlocks and speaking in fake Jamaican Patois for 45 seconds, prompting Michaels to allegedly ban him. It was previously thought to be an ad-lib, but was later revealed to have been rehearsed.

Plagiarism allegations
 The sketch "O'Callahan & Son Pub", aired March 18, 1995, on the episode hosted by Paul Reiser, was entirely lifted from a standup routine by comedian Rick Shapiro by cast member/writer Jay Mohr. During rehearsal three weeks later, Mohr was brought to Michaels and shown a tape of Shapiro's act. Mohr denied any knowledge of Shapiro or his act at the time, but later admitted in his memoir that he had stolen the sketch word for word from Shapiro's work. Shapiro and his manager sued the show and gained an undisclosed settlement, which included the removal of the sketch from all reruns of the show.
 "Ladies Who Lunch," a sketch that aired on the September 25, 2010, episode hosted by Amy Poehler, was deemed similar to the Tim and Eric Awesome Show, Great Job! segment "Tiny Hats." Both Tim Heidecker and Eric Wareheim jokingly tweeted links to the video. Heidecker told Vulture that "I watched it this morning, and found it to be very similar to our sketch, surprisingly similar," while noting it also could have been coincidental.
 The sketch "River Sisters," aired on the October 4, 2014, episode hosted by Sarah Silverman, was accused of plagiarizing "Rollin'", a similar sketch performed by the Los Angeles improvisation group the Groundlings.
 A May 9, 2015, sketch showed a contestant on a Win, Lose or Draw-style game show panicking at being asked to draw the Muslim prophet Muhammad. Viewers compared the sketch to a "strikingly similar" January 2015 sketch on the Canadian sketch comedy series This Hour Has 22 Minutes, igniting allegations of plagiarism.
 In a 2017 episode hosted by Louis C.K., a sketch aired in which a man, played by C.K., hires a clown (Bobby Moynihan) to perform at a birthday party at which he is the sole audience member. Comedian Tig Notaro accused the show's writers of plagiarizing her short film Clown Service. Notaro further claimed that a writer who was aware of Clown Service worked on Birthday Clown, and that Notaro and C.K. had not spoken for over a year.
 In the November 2018 episode hosted by Jonah Hill, a sketch entitled "America's Got Talent: Wait, They're Good?" was aired. Several fans pointed out the similarities between the performance and a YouTube video posted by comedian Gus Johnson entitled, "Every Episode Of America's Got Talent", and leveled accusations of plagiarism at the show. Johnson himself said that he considered it a coincidence and that he did not feel SNL intended to plagiarize him. In a video made in response, he stated "I really don't even think that SNL did anything wrong; they probably didn't even see my stupid video anyway. I mean, you can't keep up with all the memes on the internet."
 The founders of the sketch comedy troupe Temple Horses alleged that two sketches from Season 44, "The Pumpkin Patch" from the October 13, 2018, episode hosted by Awkwafina and "Pound Puppy" from the February 16, 2019, episode hosted by Don Cheadle, were plagiarized from their own earlier sketches "Pet Blinders" and "Not Trying to Fuck This Pumpkin," uploaded to YouTube in 2011 and 2014 respectively. In a statement to Variety, Ryan Hoffman said "Imagine, one day you come home and it looks like somebody's robbed your house, what do you want from that situation? We feel like somebody took our stuff, and this isn't the kind of thing where you can just get it back or call your insurance company to have it replaced, so at this point we're just speaking out about it."
 The January 30, 2021 episode hosted by John Krasinski included a sketch in which a man is aided during sex by a rat from Ratatouille kept underneath his hat. This was widely accused to be plagiarized from Cum Town, a comedy podcast associated with would-be cast member Shane Gillis, who later went on to mention the incident on their show.
 The October 1, 2022 season 48 premiere, hosted by Miles Teller, featured a sketch titled "Charmin Bears" centered around a family of bears, as seen in the television commercials for Charmin toilet paper. The plot consisted of the son of the family breaking the news to his parents that he was uninterested in pursuing a bathroom related higher education and would rather become a dancer instead. The sketch was singled out as being similar in concept to an animated short by YouTuber Joel Haver, which was uploaded July 14, 2022, in which a young Charmin bear tries to convince his parents to let him pursue an education in theater or dancing rather than the toilet paper focused family business. Haver responded to the sketch in a video posted October 3, 2022 where he encouraged his audience to give SNL's writers the benefit of the doubt and chalked up the similarities to parallel thinking. Haver also explicitly requested of series creator Lorne Michaels  that no negative consequences befall the writer of the sketch before taking the opportunity to shine a spotlight on some smaller creators.

References

Bibliography

Further reading

 

Saturday Night Live
Saturday Night Live incidents, List of